The following is the list of laws passed by the 16th Congress of the Philippines:

References 

+16th Congress
Presidency of Benigno Aquino III
History of the Congress of the Philippines